The Central Area Transmission System (known as CATS) is a natural gas transportation and processing system that transports natural gas through a 404 kilometre pipeline from the Central North Sea to a reception and processing terminal at Teesside in the North East of England.

History
Plans for the site began from the discovery of BP's Lomond field in May 1972. In addition, other fields were discovered in the Central Graben Area of the North Sea.

The receiving terminal site for the system was built between 1990 and 1993. It was originally operated by Amoco. The CATS pipeline was completed in 1993, receiving gas from two of Amoco's fields: Everest and Lomond, now owned by Chrysaor.

Together with the development of the Everest and Lomond fields, the project, which included the construction of an offshore riser platform and pipeline, was one of the largest construction projects ever undertaken in the UK, second only to the Channel Tunnel at that time.

Due to increased demand within the Central North Sea, the decision was taken to provide a processing service to future users of the CATS pipeline, enabling delivery of their gas into the National Transmission System.  This required the construction of a pipeline reception and gas treatment facility, and the CATS gas and liquids processing plant, comprising two processing trains, each with the capacity to handle around 17 million standard cubic metres of gas per day. The first of the new trains went into operation four months ahead of schedule in May 1997, and the second train was commissioned in 1998.

In July 2007, the CATS pipeline was damaged by the anchor of the vessel 'Young Lady'. The pipeline was shut-in for two months.

Route
The pipeline reaches the shore at Coatham Sands near Redcar where there is a Beach Valve Station, remotely operated from the CATS terminal.

The CATS pipeline was originally conceived to carry natural gas from the Everest and Lomond fields and was built oversized to accommodate future production from fields in the surrounding area. The CATS pipeline now transports gas from over 30 producing fields including J-block, MONARB, ETAP, Erskine, Armada, Andrew, Huntington, Banff, Stella, Culzean and Everest. Customers can connect directly to CATS at any one of six connection points along the pipeline (known as 'tees'), at the riser platform, or via one of 11 hubs.

Technical description 
The CATS riser platform gathers natural gas from a number of fields. The incoming gas from Everest and other fields connected by separate pipelines including Armada, Lomond and Erskine, is aggregated on the riser platform. From the riser platform, the gas is transported via the CATS pipeline, a 404 kilometre long natural gas subsea pipeline. The outside of the pipe is coated in concrete which gives added protection and also ensures that it remains on the seabed while the gas is in transit. The inside of the pipe is lined with an epoxy film, which reduces friction and corrosion, thus maximising its capacity and prolonging the life of the pipeline.

The CATS pipeline fluid specifications for entry and redelivery are as follows.

Ownership 
Antin Infrastructure Partners is the majority owner of CATS and one of the first non-oil and gas companies to own a significant part of UKCS midstream infrastructure.

A European private equity company focused on infrastructure investments, Antin acquired a controlling interest in CATS in July 2014.  In April 2015, Antin agreed terms with BP to acquire their share in the CATS business, taking their stake to 99 per cent. The deal with BP completed on 17 December 2015.

Other partners with equity in CATS are Eni (0.3388 per cent) and Chrysaor (0.6630 per cent).

Antin owns its 99 per cent stake in CATS via a wholly owned subsidiary called Kellas Midstream Limited. Kellas Midstream (formerly known as CATS Management Limited), is accountable for setting the strategy and delivering safe and efficient operational and financial performance, along with growing the business.

Kellas Midstream appointed Wood as its operating partner.  Wood provide the resources to manage the day-to-day operation of the CATS terminal and pipeline.

Antin's investment in CATS is bringing new focus to the asset, and represents a new business model for the North Sea.

CATS Terminal
The Central Area Transmission System Terminal is the reception and processing facility for the CATS pipeline.

It is located in Teesmouth (54°36’43”N, 1°11’45”W) at Seal Sands (borough of Stockton on Tees) on the North Sea coast, and occupies a 29-hectare site. It is situated in the middle of Teesmouth's petrochemical area, between an oil terminal to the north, and a chemical works and the former Teesside Oil Refinery (to the south).

The facility processes the gas through processing trains that ensure that its quality meets the requirements for entry to the National Transmission System (NTS). Natural Gas Liquids (NGLs) are removed and the processed natural gas is fiscally metered before leaving the terminal and being fed directly into the NTS. The NGLs are then separated into propane, butane and condensate.

In 2018, CATS delivered over 5 billion cubic metres of gas to UK markets, representing approximately 14% of UK gas production and 7% of demand.

Gas processing
The CATS gas terminal has the capacity to process about 34 million standard cubic metres of natural gas a day in two parallel processing trains.

The pipeline reception and gas treatment facilities comprise:

 Inlet reception – pig receiver, slug catcher and filter. From the inlet reception fluids flow to the CATS or to the TGPP terminal.
 Gas treating – mercury removal and hydrogen sulphide H2S/mercury treaters
 Dewpoint control units – Joule-Thomson valve chilling then into separator vessel, gas is metered prior to export, liquid passes through a H2S removal vessel prior to metering and export  
 Gas dehydration (2 trains) – counter current contact with tri-ethylene glycol (TEG) facility which includes a TEG cold finger regeneration system
 Cold separation – dehydrated gas undergoes Joule-Thomson valve cooling then flows to a low temperature separator, gas from the separator is heated and metered prior to export to the National Transmission System (NTS), liquid from the separator passes to the  stabiliser column
 Stabilization and compression – stabilizer overhead vapour (methane and ethane) is compressed and is routed to NTS, liquid from the stabilizer flows to the depropanizer
 Fractionation – depropanizer overhead vapour (propane) is cooled, passes through a H2S removal vessel, and is metered prior to sale as propane, the bottom product from the depropanizer is routed to the debutanizer, overhead product from the debutanizer (butane) is cooled, metered and sold as butane, bottom product from the debutanizer is cooled, metered and sold as natural gas liquids (NGL).
The propane and butane are produced to the following specification.

Propane and butane are supplied to Norsea. Gasoline (C5+) is supplied to Navigator and Sabic.

Distribution
The purified natural gas is metered and enters the National Transmission System at an above ground installation (54°36’37”N, 1°11’48”W) in the south-west corner of the terminal site. The four-mile (6 km) spur of Feeder Main FM06 transports gas to a pigging and pressure reduction station at Cowpen Bewley in Stockton-on-Tees, where gas is delivered into the Regional Transmission System, there are also connections to the 24-inch Feeder Main FM06 from Little Burdon to Billingham and into the 42-inch Feeder Main FM13 from Cowpen Bewley to Bishop Auckland.

The site has two tall chimneys and one taller flare stack.

The site belongs to the Teesmouth Industry and Wildlife Partnership.

TGPP terminal 
From 1999, gas that was not processed by the CATS terminal went to the plant immediately to the west (54°36’38”N, 1°12’01”W) which was originally operated by px Ltd. Originally some of this gas went through the px Ltd plant to the (former Enron) 1875MW Teesside power station, next to the former ICI plant at Wilton, Redcar and Cleveland. This power station was de-commissioned in 2015 and subsequently demolished, only the 2 x GIS (gas insulated substations) 275kV feeder points to the National Grid remain.

This terminal is known as the Teesside Gas Processing Plant or TGPP. In addition to CATS it also processes gas from Breagh field in the Southern North Sea, Block 42/13a. Gas and associated condensate from Breagh Alpha platform is transported via 20-inch diameter 110 km pipeline to Coatham Sands, Redcar and then by a 10 kilometre onshore pipeline to TGPP at Seal Sands. The Breagh Alpha platform is unmanned and is operated remotely from the TGPP Control Room. There is a dedicated gas treatment train for Breagh fluids.

Entry specification 
The Breagh Southern North Sea (SNS) pipeline is available to third party production. The fluid specification for entry into the SNS pipeline is as follows.

Gas processing (CNS/CATS) 
The CATS processing train uses turbo-expanders to reduce the temperature of the gas to remove natural gas liquids. CATS gas is first dehydrated with TEG to remove water. The gas is routed to two turbo-expanders in series which chills the gas and condenses out the natural gas liquids, the product is mainly methane. NGL goes to the deethanizer fractionation column which removes ethane, this is mixed with the methane and is supplied to the National Transmission System. The NTS access point is the above ground installation  (54°36’37”N, 1°11’48”W) on the CATS terminal site. NGLs from the deethanizer goes successively to a depropanizer and debutanizer which produce Propane and Butane and natural gasoline. The petroleum products are then transferred by pipeline either to liquid storage or to other petrochemical businesses based on Teesside for use as feedstock.

Gas processing (SNS) 
The Southern North Sea pipeline reception and gas treatment facilities include the following.

A pig receiver and slug catcher. Vapour from the slug catcher is cooled and chilled in a gas-to-gas heat exchanger, then by a refrigerant system, and a Joule-Thomson pressure reduction valve before the, now two-phase, mixture passes to a separator. Gas is warmed in the gas-to-gas exchanger and flows through a filter and flow meter and is routed to the National Transmission System.

Liquid from the cold separator is routed to a condensate separator which separates the liquid into monoethylene glycol MEG, which passes to the rich MEG storage tank, and condensate which flows to the 1st stage condensate separator which also receives liquids from the slug catcher. Gas from the 1st stage separator passes to the flash gas compressor, MEG is routed to the rich MEG tank, and condensate is heated and flows to the 2nd stage condensate separator. Gas from the 2nd stage separator passes to the flash gas compressor, and liquid is pumped through a mercury removal bed to the condensate surge drum.

MEG from the rich MEG storage tank is routed though the MEG regeneration plant where water is stripped out. MEG flows to the lean MEG storage tank from where it is pumped to the Breagh Alpha platform via a 3-inch pipeline piggybacked with the 20-inch gas line.

The NGLs from all the plants are transported by pipeline to petrochemical companies in the Teesmouth area. Condensate is pumped to Sabic for use as a feedstock or to a tanker loading facility. The propane and butane goes to the Phillips Norsea plant, and the condensate goes to Sabic North Tees on the former ICI site at Wilton and to the Tees Storage site owned by Vopak in Seal Sands.

See also 

 Everest gas field
 List of oil and gas fields in the North Sea
 Eastern Trough Area Project
 Teesside oil terminal

References

External links

 Central Area Transmission System
 CATS at BP (PDF)
 CATS pipeline (BG Group website)

BP buildings and structures
North Sea energy
Natural gas pipelines in the United Kingdom
Natural gas terminals
Energy infrastructure completed in 1993
Natural gas plants
Borough of Stockton-on-Tees
Buildings and structures in County Durham